Pedro Muñoz Romero (born 29 November 1952), known as Pedro Damián, is a Mexican actor, television producer and director, executive producer of popular teen telenovelas, Clase 406, Lola, Erase Una Vez, Mis XV, Rebelde, Like La Leyenda and RBD: La Familia,  distributed within and outside Mexico. He has worked with RBD, Eiza Gonzalez and is now working with LIKE.

Career

Acting
Damián began his career in 1971, appearing in the Mexican telenovela El amor tiene cara de mujer. Throughout the 1970s he appeared in Mexican films and telenovelas and had roles in two Hollywood films, The Return of a Man Called Horse (1976) and Eagle's Wing (1979). Apart from a role in El vuelo del águila (1990s), Damián's acting career had ceased until 2001; he returned with an uncredited role in an American movie for Showtime television, Warden of Red Rock.

Small roles in two more American films, Collateral Damage (costarring Arnold Schwarzenegger) and Showtime(costarring Eddie Murphy and Robert De Niro) followed in 2002. The same year he returned to movies in Mexico in the film Amar te duele (As the father of “Renata” the main character). In 2007, he appeared in Amar and Deseo, and played a recurring character in the Mexican television series S.O.S.: Sexo y otros Secretos.

As director/producer
Damián was a founder and the musical director of the Mexican youth music group Timbiriche. His first role as TV director was for the Mexican telenovela La Pobre Señorita Limantour in 1983, which was followed by others throughout the 1980s. In 1986, he began directing telenovelas for producer Carla Estrada; the two would continue to collaborate until he became a producer with the network.

His first credit as producer was for Ángeles sin paraiso in 1992. He produced seven more telenovelas for Televisa during the 1990s, including El abuelo y yo, this while continuing to direct. In 2002 he was executive producer for a telenovela for teens, Clase 406, running over four seasons and 365 episodes.

This was followed by Rebelde, which ran for three seasons and 440 episodes. Cast members of the series formed a band, RBD, which Damián represented and produced. Damián is executive producer for the spinoff series, RBD: La Familia, and has produced three specials for RBD.

When Damian left the Estrada unit to form his own producing unit, Reynaldo Lopez took his place as director of the Estrada unit's television series, staying until 2007.

Personal life
Damián was born and raised in Mexico City, D.F., Mexico by a Mexican mother and Spanish father. He is the father himself of actresses Alexa (b.1982) and Andrea Damián from his first marriage with Phillipa, brother of actor and TV director Juan Carlos Muñoz, and uncle of actor Yago Muñoz. From his marriage with Vicky Diaz has twin children, Roberta and Damian.

Filmography

Actor

Films

 Father of the Bride (2022)

Amar (2008) - Amado
 Cansada de besar sapos (2006) - Juan 
 Que Hay Detrás de RBD (DVD) (2006) Doc.
 Amar te duele (2002) - Armando
 Showtime (2002) - Caesar Vargas 
 Collateral Damage (2002) - River Rat
 The warden of Red Rock (2001) - Billy
 Gringo viejo (1989) - Capitán Ovando
 Los confines (1987) - pedro
 Mundo mágico (1983) - cosmo
 Caboblanco (1980) - Eduardo
 Mojado Power (1979) - nikolas perez pañacios
 Eagle's Wing (1979) - José
 Anacrusa (1979) - adomari
 La mujer perfecta (1977) - Pablo
 Ronda revolucionaria (1976) - evaº
 The Return of a Man Called Horse (1976) - Standing Bear 
 Un Amor extraño (1975) - jaime
 Los 7 pecados capitales (1975)  - ñoño
 La isla de los hombres solos (1974)  -solt
 Los cachorros (1971)  - bold

Tenovelas and soap operas
 S.O.S: Sexo y Otros Secretos (2007) - Genaro
 Clase 406 (2003) - Vargas
 El vuelo del águila (1994) - José María Pino Suárez
 Monte calvario (1986) - Alfonso
 Juegos del destino (1985) - Javier
 Bianca Vidal (1983) - Gustavo
 Cachún cachún ra ra! (1981) - Profesor Buenrostro
 Ángel Guerra (1979)
 Humillados y ofendidos (1977)
 Mundo de juguete (1974)
 Mi rival (1973) - Daniel
 Me llaman Martina Sola (1972)
 El amor tiene cara de mujer (1971) - Aníbal

Producer

Telenovelas and Soap operas
 Like (2018)
 Despertar contigo (2016) 
 Muchacha Italiana Viene a Casarse (2014)
 Miss XV (2012)
 Niña de mi Corazón (2010)
 Verano de Amor (2009)
 Lola, érase una vez (2007) 
 Rebelde (2004–06) 
 Clase 406 (2002/03) 
 Primer amor - A 1000 X Hora (2000/01) 
 Amor Gitano (1999)
 Preciosa (1998)
 Mi pequeña traviesa (1997/98)
 Si Dios Me Quita La Vida (1995) (primera parte)
 Prisionera de amor (1994) 
 Ángeles sin paraíso (1992/93)
 El abuelo y yo (1992)

Director

Telenovelas and Soap operas
 Chispita (1982)
La Pobre Señorita Limantour (1983)
 Quinceañera (1987)
 Carrusel (1989)
 Prisionera de Amor (1994)
 Luz Clarita (1996)
 Los hijos de nadie (1997)
 Mi Pequeña Traviesa (1997)
 Preciosa (1998)
 Amor Gitano (1999)
 Mis XV (2012)
 Muchacha Italiana viene a casarse (2014)

TV series
 RBD: La Familia (2007)
 Adicción R (2005)
 RBD: El fenómeno (2005)

Awards and nominations

Premios TVyNovelas

References

External links 

Biography of Pedro Damián at the Esmas

1952 births
Living people
Mexican male telenovela actors
Mexican male television actors
Mexican male film actors
Mexican telenovela producers
Mexican television producers
Mexican telenovela directors
20th-century Mexican male actors
21st-century Mexican male actors
Male actors from Mexico City
People from Mexico City